Werner Jacob (4 March 1938 – 23 May 2006) was a German organist, composer and academic.

Career 
Werner Fritz Hermann Herbert Jacob was born in Mengersgereuth, Thuringia. He studied at the Musikhochschule Freiburg to 1961, organ with Walter Kraft, harpsichord, composition with Wolfgang Fortner, and conducting with Carl Ueter. He studied organ also privately with Anton Nowakowski.

Jacob was the church musician at St. Sebald in Nuremberg from 1969 to 1991.

Jacob was professor of artistic organ playing (Künstlerisches Orgelspiel) at the Hochschule für Musik und Darstellende Kunst Stuttgart from 1976 to 1998. He was a composer in many genres. A symphony in five movements was unfinished when he died in Nuremberg.

Awards 

Compositions 
 Fantasie, Adagio und Epilog
 Improviation sur E.B. (Ernst Bloch) (1970)
 Metamorphosen über Themen aus Max Regers op.135b  (1975)
 Cinque Pezzi sacri
 Suscipe verbum (1996) for horn in F and orgel after a responsorium of the "Maulbronn-Lichtentahler Antiphonale"
 ...sine nomine super nominam...I, Fantasia per organo, timpani e altri strumenti a percussione (1985) 
 Quartet for oboe, clarinet, horn and bassoon (1960) 
 De visione resurrectionis for mixed choir, baritone solo, two groups of percussion and organ (1966) 
 Telos nomou for spreaker and instruments
 Babel for speaker, five soloists and mixed choir
 Canticum II – Canticum Canticorum (Song of Songs) for soloists, choir and instrumentalists
 Canticum III – Canticum Caritatis "Wenn ich mit Menschen und Engelszungen redete" for soprano, two gongs and tamtam (1991)

Recordings 
 Johann Sebastian Bach, Das Orgelwerk (complete organ works), Emi-Classics
 Max Reger, Die großen Orgelwerke, Emi-Classics
 Orgelmusik der Familie Bach, Wagnerorgel im Dom zu Brandenburg, ETERNA 8 26 869, 1977

External links 

 Compositions Edition Gravis
 Compositions Breitkopf & Härtel

German classical organists
German male organists
Academic staff of the State University of Music and Performing Arts Stuttgart
1938 births
Musicians from Thuringia
2006 deaths
Officers Crosses of the Order of Merit of the Federal Republic of Germany
20th-century organists
20th-century German male musicians
People from Sonneberg (district)
20th-century classical musicians
Male classical organists